Boston is a Hasidic dynasty, originally established in 1915 by Rabbi Pinchas David Horowitz, a scion of the Nikolsburg Hasidic dynasty. Following the custom of European Chassidic Courts, where the Rebbe was called after the name of his city, the Bostoner branch of Hasidic Judaism was named after Boston, Massachusetts. The most senior and well-known of the Bostoner Rebbes in contemporary times was Grand Rabbi Levi Yitzchak Horowitz, who died in December 2009.

Amid a spectrum of notable accomplishments and "firsts in America," Bostoner Hasidim claim to be skilled in applying ancient Jewish values in modern society, engaging in outreach to students, and providing tangible help for the sick and their families during crucial times of need. Bostoner Hasidim also pride themselves on their musical tradition.

The worldwide community of Bostoner Hasidism has headquarters in Brookline, Massachusetts and Har Nof, Israel, with additional branches in Beit Shemesh, Israel; Beitar Illit, West Bank; Flatbush, Brooklyn; Highland Park, New Jersey; Lawrence, Nassau County, New York; and Monsey, New York.

Origins

Grand Rabbi Pinchas David Horowitz, the first Bostoner Rebbe, a scion of Shmelke of Nikolsburg and the Lelov dynasty, was born in Jerusalem in Ottoman Syria. He first arrived in Boston in 1915 from the Russian Empire, where he had gone to collect charity.

Shortly after his arrival, Rabbi Pinchas David was accepted as Rebbe by a group of followers he attracted from within the Boston Jewish community.  However, in 1939, he left Boston and moved to Brooklyn where he opened the Bostoner beth midrash of Williamsburg, Brooklyn. After his death in 1941, his older son, Rav Moshe, succeeded him in New York, while his younger son, Levi Yitzchak Horowitz, moved back to Boston in 1943 and built the New England Chassidic Center.

In his lifetime, Reb Moshe founded the Bostoner beth midrash of Crown Heights, Brooklyn and the Bostoner beth midrash of Borough Park, Brooklyn. In 1985, upon the passing of Reb Moshe, his eldest son, Chaim Avrom Horowitz, succeeded him as Bostoner Rebbe of New York. In 1989, Reb Moshe's younger son, Pinchas Dovid, moved to Flatbush, Brooklyn to establish a community there. He eventually accepted the mantle of Bostoner Rebbe of Flatbush.  In 2006, Rav Chaim Avrom moved to Beit Shemesh in Israel to establish a community there. He died in 2016 while visiting America for his granddaughter's wedding to the grandson of the Skverer and Rachmanstrifker Rebbes. He was succeeded by his sons, Rabbi Yaakov Yitzchak Horowitz of Lawrence, NY, And Rav Yisrael Yona Horowitz of Boro Park.

In the mid 1980s, Levi Yitzchak Horowitz established another Boston community in Har Nof, Jerusalem, and would spend half of the year in Boston and half of the year in Jerusalem. On Saturday, December 5, 2009 Levi Yitzchok Horowitz died in Jerusalem, survived by his three sons and two daughters. In his spiritual will, the title of Grand Rabbi of Boston was bestowed upon all three surviving sons. Pinchas Dovid Horowitz, the Chuster Rebbe of Borough Park, the oldest, serves as Bostoner Rebbe in New York; Mayer Alter Horowitz serves as Bostoner Rebbe in Har Nof; and Naftali Yehuda Horowitz, the youngest, serves as Bostoner Rebbe in Boston.

Lineage of the Boston dynasty

Grand Rabbi Pinchos Duvid Horowitz (1876–1941) first Bostoner Rebbe
Grand Rabbi Moshe Horowitz (died 1985) Bostoner Rebbe of New York – Born in Jerusalem, he was the elder son of Rabbi Pinchas and the first Chasidic Rebbe to succeed his father in America, establishing a Bostoner Beis Medrash in Crown Heights, Brooklyn and later in Borough Park, Brooklyn. He was active in the formation of Agudath Israel of America and a member of its Moetzes Gedolei HaTorah (Council of Torah Sages), and was a founder of Yeshiva Torah Vodaas. He worked with the Vaad Hatzalah to help settle Jewish refugees in America during and after World War II.
Grand Rabbi Chaim Avrohom Horowitz, Bostoner Rebbe of Borough Park 1985 to 2016 and Ramat Beit Shemesh 
Rabbi Yaakov Yitzchak Horowitz of Lawrence, NY – son of Grand Rabbi Chaim Avrohom
Rabbi Yisroel Yona Horowitz Bostoner Rebbe of Boro Park – son of Grand Rabbi Chaim Avrohom
Grand Rabbi Pinchas Duvid Horowitz, present Bostoner Rebbe of Flatbush – son of Grand Rabbi Moshe Horowitz
Rabbi Mordechai Horowitz R"M of Darchei Noam – son of Grand Rabbi Pinchos Dovid of Flatbush
Rabbi Chaim Avrohom Horowitz of Monsey – son of Grand Rabbi Pinchos Duvid of Flatbush
Grand Rabbi Levi Yitzchak Horowitz, (1921–2009) the Bostoner Rebbe in Brookline and Har Nof – son of Rabbi Pinchas David Horowitz
Rabbi Pinchas Duvid Horowitz (1943–2021), Chuster Ruv – eldest son of Grand Rabbi Levi Yitzchok, successor to his father as Bostoner–Chuster Rebbe of New York, and Chuster–Bostoner Rebbe of Betar Illit
Rabbi Moshe Shimon Horowitz, Bostoner Ruv of Betar Illit - eldest son of the Chuster–Bostoner Rebbe
Rabbi Yisroel Aharon Horowitz – son of the Chuster–Bostoner Rebbe and son-in-law of Rabbi Yitzchok Arie Weiss, Horodonka Rebbe of Manchester, England
Reb Shia'le Horowitz, Bostoner Ruv of Monsey, New York – son of the Chuster–Bostoner Rebbe
Rabbi Yechiel Mechel Horowitz, Bostoner Ruv of Highland Park, New Jersey – son of the Chuster–Bostoner Rebbe
Rabbi Mayer Alter Horowitz of Jerusalem – middle son of Grand Rabbi Levi Yitzchok, successor to his father as Bostoner Rebbe in the Har Nof section of Jerusalem.
Rabbi Naftali Yehuda Horowitz, Bostoner Rebbe (Boston) – youngest son of Grand Rabbi Levi Yitzchok, successor to his father as the Bostoner Rebbe of Boston.
Rabbi Meilich Horowitz Rav – son of current Rebbe Naftoli Yehuda Horowitz

References

External links
Official Website of the Bostoner Shul
Moshe D. Sherman Orthodox Judaism in America: A Biographical Dictionary and Sourcebook pp 94–96

Ashkenazi Jewish culture in Massachusetts
Hasidic dynasties
Hasidic Judaism in the United States
Jews and Judaism in Boston
Culture of Boston
Orthodox Judaism in Massachusetts